New Rochelle (older ) is a city in Westchester County, New York, United States, in the southeastern portion of the state. In 2020, the city had a population of 79,726, making it the seventh-largest in the state of New York. Some residents refer to the city as  New Ro or New Roc City.

History

Etymology and early history
The European settlement was started by refugee Huguenots (French Protestants) in 1688, who were fleeing religious persecution in France (such as Dragonnades) after the king's revocation of the Edict of Nantes. Many of the settlers were artisans and craftsmen from the city of La Rochelle, France, thus influencing the choice of the name of "New Rochelle".

17th and 18th centuries

Some 33 families established the community of La Nouvelle-Rochelle in 1688. A monument containing the names of these settlers stands in Hudson Park, the original landing point of the Huguenots. Thirty-one years earlier, the Siwanoy Indians, a band of Algonquian-speaking Lenape (also known as the Delaware by English colonists) sold their land to Thomas Pell. In 1689, Pell officially deeded 6,100 acres (25 km2) for the establishment of a Huguenot community. Jacob Leisler is an important figure in the early histories of both New Rochelle and the United States. He arrived in America as a mercenary in the British army and later became one of the most prominent merchants in New York. He was subsequently appointed acting-governor of the province, and it was during this time that he acted on behalf of the Huguenots.

Of all the Huguenot settlements in America founded with the intention of being distinctly French colonies, New Rochelle most clearly conformed to the plans of its founders. The colony continued to attract French refugees until as late as 1760. The choice of name for the city reflected the importance of the city of La Rochelle and of the new settlement in Huguenot history and distinctly French character of the community. French was spoken, and it was common practice for people in neighboring areas to send their children to New Rochelle to learn the language.

In 1775, General George Washington stopped in New Rochelle on his way to assume command of the Army of the United Colonies in Massachusetts. The British Army briefly occupied sections of New Rochelle and Larchmont in 1776. Following British victory in the Battle of White Plains, New Rochelle became part of a "Neutral Ground" for General Washington to regroup his troops. After the Revolutionary War ended in 1784, patriot Thomas Paine was given a farm in New Rochelle for his service to the cause of independence. The farm, totaling about 300 acres (1.2 km2), had been confiscated from its owners by state of New York due to their Tory activities.

The first national census of 1790 shows New Rochelle with 692 residents. 136 were African American, including 36 who were freemen; the remainder were enslaved.

19th and 20th centuries
Through the 18th century, New Rochelle had remained a modest village that retained an abundance of agricultural land. During the 19th century, however, New York City was a destination from the mid-century on by waves of immigration, principally from Ireland and Germany. More established American families left New York City and moved into this area. Although the original Huguenot population was rapidly shrinking in relative size, through ownership of land, businesses, banks, and small manufactures, they retained a predominant hold on the political and social life of the town.

The 1820 Census showed 150 African-Americans residing in New Rochelle, six of whom were still enslaved. The state abolished slavery by degrees: children of enslaved mothers were born free, and all enslaved people were freed by 1827.

In 1857 the Village of New Rochelle was established within the borders of the Town of New Rochelle. A group of volunteers created the first fire service in 1861. In 1899, a bill creating the New Rochelle City Charter was signed by Governor Theodore Roosevelt. It was through this bill that the Village and Town of New Rochelle were joined into one municipality. In 1899, Michael J. Dillon narrowly defeated Hugh A. Harmer to become New Rochelle's first mayor. The recently established city charter designated a board of aldermen as the legislative unit with two members to be elected from each of four wards and 10 elected from the city at-large.

By 1900, New Rochelle had a population of 14,720. Throughout the city, farms, estates, and wooded homesteads were bought up by realty and development companies. Planned residential neighborhoods such as Rochelle Park, one of the first planned communities in the country, soon spread across the city, earning New Rochelle the sobriquet "City of Homes". In 1909, Edwin Thanhouser established Thanhouser Film Corporation. Thanhouser's Million Dollar Mystery was one of the first serial motion pictures. In 1923, New Rochelle resident Anna Jones became the first African-American woman to be admitted to the New York State Bar.

Poet and resident James J. Montague captured the image of New Rochelle at the time in his 1926 poem "Queen City of the Sound".

In 1930, New Rochelle recorded a population of 54,000, up from 36,213 only ten years earlier. During the 1930s, New Rochelle was the wealthiest city per capita in New York state and the third wealthiest in the country.

By the end of the century, the Metro North railroad station was rebuilt along with a $190 million entertainment complex, nicknamed New Roc City, which featured a 19-screen movie theater, an IMAX theater, an indoor ice-hockey arena, mini-golf, go karts, an arcade, restaurants, a hotel, loft-apartments and a mega supermarket. The complex was built on the site of the former New Rochelle Mall, which had opened in 1968.

21st century

In 2014, New Rochelle's planning board approved $149 million in developments to three major sections of the city. The developments include restaurants, stores, hotels, an entertainment area, theaters and a mixed-use waterfront area, and are expected to be completed within 10 years. Additional tax breaks ranging in the tens of millions of dollars have since been awarded by the city government to further the redevelopment of the downtown area.

In March 2020, New Rochelle became one of the first reported centers for COVID-19 transmission in New York state during the 2019–20 coronavirus outbreak. On March 10, 2020, Governor Andrew Cuomo ordered components of the New York Air National Guard and New York Army National Guard to institute a one-mile radius containment area centered around the Young Israel of New Rochelle synagogue in the Wykagyl section of the City in an attempt to stem the spread of the virus. The implementation of this containment area, which covered multiple neighborhoods in New Rochelle and extended into parts of the neighboring Town of Eastchester, marked the first use in the state of New York of social distancing measures and the closure of schools, houses of worship, and other institutions to combat the spread of the pandemic. Large gathering places including schools and places of worship were declared closed, while National Guard troops were deployed to provide logistical support
such as assistance with the distribution of food and the disinfection of public areas.

Historic sites

 Columbia Island – a small island (approx.  square) situated between Davids Island and Pea Island. Up until 1940 it was known as Little Pea Island. The transmitter remained in operation until the 1960s, when the station was moved to nearby High Island.
 Execution Rocks Lighthouse – centered in the middle of Long Island Sound, just south of Davids Island. It is rumored that the lighthouse's site got its name before the American Revolutionary War when British colonial authorities executed people by chaining them to the rocks at low tide and allowing the rising water to drown them. In reality, the name was chosen to reflect the historically dangerous shipping area created by the rocks exposure during low tides.
 Huckleberry Island – a  island owned by the Huckleberry Indians, Inc., a club within the New York Athletic Club. The island is an important nesting site for waterbirds such as egrets and night herons.
 Leland Castle – a 19th-century Gothic Revival castle built as the summer residence of Simeon Leland, a wealthy New York City hotel entrepreneur. It has since been acquired by the College of New Rochelle and is used as an art gallery available to the public.
 St. John's Wilmot Church – a historic Episcopal parish located in the northern end of the City at the intersection of North Avenue and Wilmot Road, formerly referred to as "Cooper's Corner".
 Thomas Paine Historical Site – a historical nexus within the city, the site comprises: the country home of the American pamphleteer and Revolutionary War hero Thomas Paine, his burial site, monument, and a museum. Paine's Cottage was built in 1793 and is a National Historic Landmark. The Thomas Paine Memorial Building, built in 1925, houses the library and museum collection of the Thomas Paine National Historical Association. Also on the site is the Brewster Schoolhouse, one of the oldest structural relics in Westchester County.
 Trinity-St. Paul's Episcopal Church – added to the National Register of Historic Places in 2006. It is located at the northwest corner of Huguenot Street (also known as the Boston Post Road) and Division Street. This church represents the body of the majority group of New Rochelle's founding Huguenot French Calvinistic congregation that conformed to the liturgy of the established Church of England in June 1709. King George III gave Trinity its first charter in 1762. After the Revolutionary War, Trinity became a parish of the Protestant Episcopal Church of America.

Geography
New Rochelle is located at the southeastern point of continental New York State. It lies on the Long Island Sound, bordered on the west by Pelham, Pelham Manor and Eastchester, by Scarsdale to the north and east, and Mamaroneck and Larchmont to the east. According to the United States Census Bureau, the city has a total area of 13.2 square miles (34.3 km2). The city has a roughly triangular shape, approximately 10 miles (16 km) from north to south and 1.5 miles (2 km) from east to west at its widest point.

Demographics

As of the 2010 United States Census, there were 77,062 people living in the city. The racial makeup of the city was 64.9% White (47.9% Non-Hispanic White), 18.1% Black, 0.1% Native American, 4.2% Asian, <0.1% Pacific Islander, 0.3% from some other race and 1.5% from two or more races. 27.8% were Hispanic or Latino of any race.

As measured by the census of 2000, New Rochelle had a population of 72,182 people, 24,275 occupied households, and 17,546 families living in the city. The population density was 6,973.5 people per square mile (2,692.7/km2). There were 26,995 housing units at an average density of 2,608.0 per square mile (1,007.0/km2). The racial makeup of the city was 68% White, 19% African American, 0.20% Native American, 4% Asian, 0.05% Pacific Islander, 6% from other races, and 3% from two or more races. 20% of the population were Hispanic or Latino of any race. In the city, the population was spread out, with 24.0% under the age of 18, 8.7% from 18 to 24, 29.5% from 25 to 44, 22.2% from 45 to 64, and 15.5% who were 65 years of age or older. The median age was 37 years. For every 100 females, there were 90.7 males. For every 100 females age 18 and over, there were 85.9 males. There were 26,189 households, out of which 32.7% had children under the age of 18 living with them, 50.5% were married couples living together, 12.5% had a female householder with no husband present, and 33.0% were non-families. 28.0% of all households were made up of individuals, and 11.8% had someone living alone who was 65 years of age or older. The average household size was 2.68 and the average family size was 3.29.

19,312 residents of New Rochelle were enrolled in school, with 2,743 in pre-school or kindergarten, 8,105 in elementary school, 3,704 in high school and 5,030 in college or graduate school. Out of 42,872 individuals over the age of 25, 20% (9,766) had no high school diploma, 23% (11,325) were high school graduates, 14% (6,710) achieved some level of college education, 5% (2,347) held an associate degree, 19% (9,120) held a bachelor's degree and 20% (9,604) possessed a graduate or other advanced degree.

The working population was 35,262, 95.7% of whom were employed. The occupational breakdown had 42% working in 'management', 25% working in 'sales', 17% in 'services', 8% in 'construction', and 7% in 'production and transport'. The average daily commute was 30 minutes, with 60% driving to work, 12% carpooling, 18% traveling via public-transportation and 7% using other means.

According to the 2007 Census Bureau estimates, the median income for a household in the city was $64,756 and the median income for a family was $88,004. About 9.8% of the population lived below the poverty line.

According to the American Community Survey in 2018, 5.2% of the population was West Indian.

Crime
According to the New Rochelle Police Department, New Rochelle is the safest city of its size in New York State and the fifth-safest city of its size in the United States. The majority of crimes committed within New Rochelle are non-violent property crimes, including burglary, larceny-theft, motor vehicle theft, and arson. Property crime, on a scale of 1 (low crime) to 10, is 4 compared to the US average of 3. Violent crime (murder and nonnegligent manslaughter, forcible rape, robbery, and aggravated assault) is 3, equal to the US average.

Residential profile
While the formerly industrial downtown section is more densely developed, with condominiums, high rises, offices, shopping centers, affordable housing complexes, a medical center, nursing homes, two college campuses and an intermodal transportation hub, the rest of the city consists of sprawling residential neighborhoods. There are more than 11,500 single-family houses within the city, more than that of neighboring Larchmont, Mamaroneck, and Scarsdale combined. The total number of separate households surpasses 26,000, more than that of neighboring Pelham, Pelham Manor, Eastchester, Scarsdale, Mamaroneck and Larchmont combined.

Housing variety
The city contains a very diverse range of housing stock, composed of single-family and multi-family residences built from the 18th to the 21st centuries which are characteristic of various historic and modern North American architectural styles. Historic housing types particularly common in the city's older residential neighborhoods are of the Queen Anne, Tudor Revival, and Colonial Revival styles that were in vogue as the city experienced its first period of great growth during the Gilded Age era. Brownstones, townhomes, red brick apartment buildings, and modern mid-rise residential blocks are defining elements of the urban southwestern quarter of the city.  With a population approaching 80,000 residents, New York State law dictates that the city provide an adequate amount of affordable housing units. The city has been working to replace the existing Weyman Avenue Projects with more community-centered, townhouse-style housing units.

Communities

Within the greater city borders are many established neighborhoods and subsections, several of which are larger in both size and population than neighboring villages of Larchmont, Bronxville and Pelham Manor. The public community areas most noted include: Bayberry, Beechmont, Bloomingdale Estates, Bonnie Crest, Daisy Farms, Davenport Neck, Echo Manor, Forest Heights, Forest Knolls, French Ridge, Glen Island, Glenwood Lake, Lake Isle, Larchmont Woods, Northfield, Paine Heights, Pinebrook, Premium Point Park, Quaker Ridge, Residence Park, Rochelle Heights, San Souci, Scarsdale Downs, Shore Road, Sutton Manor, Vaneck Estates, Ward Acres, Wilmot Woods and Wykagyl. Brookridge, Riviera Shores, Premium Point, Pinebrook Hollow, Kensington Woods, and Cherry Lawn are gated neighborhoods accessible only by those immediate residents.

Economy
New Rochelle has been home to a variety of industries over the years, including: Thanhouser Film Studios, Terrytoons Studios, P.J. Tierney Diner Manufacturing, Flynn Burner Company, New York Seven Up (Joyce Beverages, Inc), RawlPlug, Inc., the Longines Symphonette Society, and Conran's USA. Manufacturing and warehousing has declined since the 1990s as industrial land near both exits from Interstate 95 have been converted to "big box" retailer use.

New Rochelle remains a center of business, home to the corporate headquarters of Sidney Frank Importing, Blimpies, East River Savings Bank, and Somnia Anesthesia Services.

Parks and recreation

Waterfront

 Yacht, sailing and rowing clubs dot the coast on Long Island Sound and beach clubs line the shores of Davenport Neck. Beckwithe Point, The Greentree Country Club and The Surf Club are the largest of the private shore clubs, providing waterfront recreation to members during the summer season. The New York Athletic Club sits on Travers Island, located on the border of New Rochelle and Pelham Manor.
 Echo Bay Yacht Club and Huguenot Yacht Club are two well known, private yacht clubs in the city.
 New York Sailing School and New Rochelle Rowing Club, each of which has a history dating back over 100 years.
 The City operates a large marina with 300 slips and 150 mooring spaces.

Parks

 Glen Island – In 1879, John H. Starin, a former US Congressman and New York transportation king, bought five islands which he named 'Glen Island' and created perhaps the first theme park open to the public. His 12 steamboats transported millions of New York residents and others to the attractions which included a zoo, a natural history museum, a railway, a German beer garden (around the castle-like structure which still stands today), a bathing beach, and a Chinese pagoda. Today the park is a  island property connected to the mainland by a drawbridge built in the 1920s. One of the main features of the park is its pristine, crescent shaped beach offering access to Long Island Sound.
 Five Islands Park is a series of islands connected by small footbridges and pathways, offers playground, sports, hiking and camping facilities for all residents to enjoy.
 Hudson Park encompasses  along the city's harbor front and includes a beach for residents, the city boathouse, greenhouses, the shore station of the United States Coast Guard and several yacht and rowing clubs. The park is traditionally accepted as the original landing place of the Huguenot settlers. A granite boulder with bronze tablets commemorates the event.
 Davids Island, a  island of the coast of the city, is being transformed from a former American military base (Fort Slocum) into a park and environmental preserve. Beginning just after the Civil War, the island was a military base used to protect New York Harbors, during World War I it served as an army recruitment station and up until 1967, it maintained various 'Cold War' facilities. Today it is home to a variety of plants, birds, and animals. These include the endangered Kemp's ridley sea turtle, and rare birds such as osprey and least terns. Davids Island also supports valuable wetlands, rare rocky intertidal areas, and sandy beaches. The waters surrounding the Island are home to Winter Flounder, Atlantic Herring, and Atlantic Silversides.
 Ward Acres, located in the North End, is a combination of untouched forest, wild lawns and meadows, acres of hiking, exercise trails and historic horse stables/cemeteries. In 2007, The Westchester County Department of Conservation produced a Natural Resource Management Plan in order to identify and protect the natural resource needs of the park. It encompasses , with the forests divided into four main sections, each distinct in both general characteristics and species presence. It is formed by a portion of a former private state that contained a horse farm, and by an old railroad right of way. It includes a  fenced-in dog run, and it is the only park in the City in which residents can walk a dog without a leash.
It is part of a larger "Colonial Greenway Trail" in which it connects to Twin Lakes/Nature Study and Saxon Woods parks.
 Sheldrake Lake which formerly served as a reservoir supplying the areas drinking water, is now a  park and nature conservancy promoting an increased understanding of the local ecology.
 Twin Lakes Park, combined with the adjacent Nature Study Woods comprise  of woods, marsh, lakes, ponds and some fields along the Hutchinson River in New Rochelle's Northend. There are many foot trails weaving through woods, marshlands, fields and around two large lakes (formerly reservoirs).

Golf
 Wykagyl Country Club is located in the Wykagyl section of New Rochelle on North Avenue just south of Quaker Ridge Road. Golfweek magazine ranks Wykagyl as one of America's Top 100 Classic Courses.
 Pelham Country Club, straddles the border of New Rochelle and Pelham Manor. The course is a mile from the Westchester-New York City border and Pelham Bay Park.

Tennis
 New Rochelle Tennis Club, located in Wykagyl, is one of the oldest lawn-tennis organizations in the country.

Government

Since 1932, New Rochelle has operated under a Council-Manager form of government. The City Manager is the chief administrative officer of the city selected to carry out the directives of the Council. The Manager monitors the city's fiscal condition and enforces its ordinances and laws. The City Manager is involved in the discussion of all matters coming before Council yet has no final vote. The City Council is the legislative body consisting of the Mayor and six council members. The Mayor serves as the presiding officer of the Council. Since 1993, the City has had six council districts, with one council member elected from and by each district. The Council functions to set policy, approve the annual budget, appoint the City Manager and City Clerk, and enact local laws, resolutions & ordinances.

Education

Public
The city is served by the City School District of New Rochelle, which operates a public high school, two middle schools, six elementary schools, and one pre-k through second grade Early Childhood Center.
On seven separate occasions, the City's schools have received the prestigious Blue Ribbon Award from the U.S. Department of Education. New Rochelle High School is one of the most diverse high schools in the country; the student body represents over 60 countries from around the world. The school offers over 240 courses including honors, research and advanced placement courses.

Libraries are operated by the New Rochelle Public Library System which is part of the county-wide Westchester Library System.

Private

Primary and secondary
 Hudson Montessori – private Montessori school in Wykagyl serving pre-kindergarten level through fifth grade.
 Iona Preparatory School (Upper & Lower Schools) – all-boys Catholic school serving grades kindergarten through 12.
 Mount Tom Day School – private day school serving pre-k through second grade; housed mansion of artist J. C. Leyendecker.
 The Thornton Donovan School – co-ed preparatory school in Beechmont.
 The Ursuline School – all-girls Catholic school in Wykagyl serving grades six through 12.
 Salesian High School – all-boys Roman Catholic high school (grades nine through 12)

Higher education
 The College of New Rochelle – Was once the largest women's Catholic college in the United States, founded by the sisters of the Ursuline Order. It closed in 2019.
 Iona University – Catholic college founded by the Congregation of Christian Brothers.
 Mercy College – Acquired the College of New Rochelle in 2019 to become Mercy's New Rochelle campus.
 Monroe College – provides professional, career oriented and business centered education.

Miscellaneous education
The Japanese Weekend School of New York, a Japanese weekend school, has its offices in New Roc City in New Rochelle. As of 2006, the school had about 800 students, including Japanese citizens, and Japanese Americans, at locations in Westchester County and Long Island.

Infrastructure

Transportation

Roads
Major highways include Interstate 95 and the Hutchinson River Parkway. Interstate 95 serves as the main route through New Rochelle, with four exits directly serving the city. The Hutchinson River Parkway, which is designated for passenger vehicles only, runs through much of the city. Substantial congestion on the parkway occurs in both directions during the morning and evening rush-hour.

The Boston Post Road, known as Main Street in downtown New Rochelle, is used as a major artery during the morning and evening commute. Most traffic via the Post Road is short distance or fairly local, yet vehicles have utilized Route 1 during times of heavy congestion on I-95 as a re-route.

Public transit
The city has a train station served by Metro North on the New Haven Line and Amtrak on the Northeast Corridor via its Northeast Regional train. The city is also served by the Bee-Line Bus System for local service. Adirondack Trailways provides interstate bus service.

Rail transit began in New Rochelle around 1848, when the New York & New Haven opened their line along Long Island Sound. After the Civil War, proposals for new railroads reached new levels. Banking that the city would continue to grow northward, the New York, Westchester and Boston Railway Company was established to serve the large populations moving to the suburbs. Two main lines were built as part of the NYW&B; the Port Chester line and the White Plains line. While the populations of some communities served by the NYW&B did grow between 1912 and 1937, the growth was not sufficient or fast enough to provide adequate business for the railroad, and service was discontinued on December 31, 1937.

Air Travel
Westchester County is served by Westchester County Airport. Additionally, New Rochelle is easily accessed by New York City airports (JFK, LaGuardia), and New Jersey's Teterboro and Newark Airport.

Emergency services

Fire

The New Rochelle Fire Department (NRFD) provides fire protection and first responder emergency medical services to the city of New Rochelle. The New Rochelle Fire Department responds to approximately 8,000 emergency calls annually. The city also contracts with a commercial ambulance service, Transcare Emergency Medical Ambulance Services, to provide dedicated ALS Ambulances to the city 24/7, 365. Two ambulances from Transcare EMS are stationed at two New Rochelle Fire Department firehouses in the southern and northern sections of the city. The New Rochelle Fire Department is sub-divided into two main divisions of operation: Fire and Emergency Operations, and Support Services. Each of these divisions is commanded by a Deputy Chief.

The Fire and Emergency Operations Division is commanded by four Deputy Chiefs, one per shift/squad, who reports to the Chief of Department/Fire Commissioner. This division supervises the department's eight fire companies and 155 uniformed members.

The NRFD currently operates out of five fire stations, located throughout the city, under the command of one Deputy Chief/Tour Commander per shift. The New Rochelle Fire Department also operates and maintains a fire apparatus fleet of five engines, three ladders, one rescue, and numerous special, support, and reserve units. In addition to the five fire stations, the NRFD also operates a Fire Headquarters administrative building.

Police

The Town of New Rochelle formed its first professional police department in 1885, 14 years before the city incorporated in 1899. The Department currently has 186 sworn officers and a total staff of more than 250. In 1993, the Department was certified as an accredited agency by the New York State Law Enforcement Accreditation Council. Special programs include community oriented policing through the 'Police and Community Together' (PACT) program, harbor patrol, and a bicycle patrol.

Health care
Sound Shore Medical Center, also known as Montefiore New Rochelle Hospital, is a not-for-profit health care organization located in New Rochelle that treats over 85,000 patients annually and operates the only New York State Area Trauma Center in southern Westchester County.

Ambulance service is provided by Transcare EMS, which operates three Paramedic-staffed Medic Ambulances throughout the city.

Notable people

Popular culture

Studios
In the early 20th century, New Rochelle was home to one of the first movie studios in the country, Edwin Thanhouser's Thanhouser Film Corporation. Originally located on the corner of Warren and Grove Street, the company moved to Main Street near Echo Avenue after a devastating fire in 1913. The studio is noted for filming the first serial in motion pictures, named The Million Dollar Mystery.

Terrytoons animation studio was located in New Rochelle from 1928 to 1968. Its most popular characters include Mighty Mouse, Gandy Goose, Dinky Duck, Deputy Dawg, Luno and Heckle and Jeckle.

In films and television

Dr. Jekyll and Mr. Hyde (1912) was filmed in New Rochelle.
Scenes in Goodfellas were filmed in the city.
The 1996 romantic comedy Love Is All There Is was filmed at the Greentree Country Club on Davenport Neck.
The Oscar-nominated Burt Reynolds film Starting Over includes a scene filmed at what is now known as the Hudson Montessori School on Quaker Ridge Road.
Scenes of the movie Burn After Reading, starring Brad Pitt and George Clooney, were filmed in Sutton Manor.
 The Oranges, a Hugh Laurie movie, has scenes filmed inside two homes in the Beechmont neighborhood.
 In The Post, Kay Graham (the character played by Meryl Streep) home's exterior was filmed at a home on Beechmont Avenue.
 The Petrie family famously made their home at 148 Bonnie Meadow Road in New Rochelle on The Dick Van Dyke Show in the 1960s.
 2002's Catch Me If You Can was partly set in New Rochelle.

Sister city
New Rochelle's "sister city" is La Rochelle, France, a city and commune of western France. There has been a "friendly relationship" between the two cities since 1910.

See also

 National Register of Historic Places listings in New Rochelle, New York

References

External links

 

 
Cities in New York (state)
Huguenot history in the United States
Transit-oriented developments in the United States
Populated places established in 1688
Cities in Westchester County, New York
Cities in the New York metropolitan area
Populated coastal places in New York (state)
1688 establishments in the Province of New York